Zoltán Mechlovits (1891 – 25 March 1951 in Budapest) was a male former international table tennis player from Hungary.

Table tennis career
From 1926 and 1929 he won eleven medals in singles, doubles, and team events in the World Table Tennis Championships. This included six gold medals; three in the team event, one in the singles and two in the mixed doubles with Mária Mednyánszky.

See also
 List of table tennis players
 List of World Table Tennis Championships medalists

References

External links
 Wiesław Pięta, Aleksandra Pięta , Czech and Polish Table Tennis Players of Jewish Origin in International Competition (1926-1957) , PHYSICAL CULTURE AND SPORT. STUDIES AND RESEARCH

Hungarian male table tennis players
1891 births
1951 deaths
Jewish table tennis players
20th-century Hungarian people